Oxepane is a heterocyclic chemical compound with the formula C6H12O: a cycloheptane in which one methylene group is replaced by oxygen.

Oxepane can be polymerized by cationic initiators such as (C2H5)3OSbCl6 to form a crystalline solid with a melting point around 56–58 °C.

References

Oxepanes